Phyllomydas is a genus of mydas flies (insects in the family Mydidae). There are about seven described species in Phyllomydas.

Species
These seven species belong to the genus Phyllomydas:
 Phyllomydas bruesii Johnson, 1926 i c g b
 Phyllomydas currani Hardy, 1943 i c g b
 Phyllomydas parvulus (Westwood, 1841) i c g b
 Phyllomydas phyllocerus Bigot, 1880 i c g b
 Phyllomydas quercus Wilcox, 1978 i c g b
 Phyllomydas scitulus (Williston, 1886) i c g b
 Phyllomydas weemsi Wilcox, 1978 i c g
Data sources: i = ITIS, c = Catalogue of Life, g = GBIF, b = Bugguide.net

References

Further reading

 

Mydidae
Articles created by Qbugbot
Asiloidea genera